Midland Counties Railway Locomotives. In its short life, the Midland Counties Railway bought nearly fifty steam locomotives from a number of manufacturers. Initially, outside-cylindered engines were ordered because of the frequency of crank axle breakage with inside cylinders. However, one of the sub-committee delegated to order the motive power, Theodore Rathbone, was an admirer of the Bury engines used on the London and Birmingham Railway, and all further orders were for inside-cylindered locos. The initial delivery of engines had 11-inch cylinders, but, being found to be short of power, further orders were for engines with 13-inch cylinders.

Builders

Butterley Company
Butterley Company, Derbyshire
 1. Ariel 2-2-2 built 1839 Driving wheels 5'0" diameter, Cylinders 11x16 (outside)
(renamed Bee in 1841)
 2. Hercules 2-2-2 built 1840 Driving wheels 5'6" diameter, Cylinders 13x18 (outside)
 
Ariel hauled one of the inaugural trains from Nottingham to Derby, following Sunbeam. Nevertheless, the Butterley locos would not appear to have been satisfactory, since the railway refused to pay for them until the end of 1841.

Jones, Turner and Evans
Jones, Turner and Evans, Newton-le-Willows
 4. Sunbeam 2-2-0 built 1839 Driving wheels 5'6" diameter, Cylinders 12x18 
 5. Wizard 2-2-0 built 1839 Driving wheels 5'6" diameter, Cylinders 12x18 
 6. Hecate 2-2-0 built 1839 Driving wheels 5'6" diameter, Cylinders 12x18

Four coupled:
 46. Fox 0-4-2 built 1840 Driving wheels 5'0" diameter, Cylinders 13x20 
 47. Rob Roy 0-4-2 (? 2-2-2) 1839 Driving wheels 5'6" diameter, Cylinders 13x18

Stark and Fulton
Stark and Fulton, Glasgow
 3. Hawk 2-2-0 built 1839 Driving wheels 5'6" diameter, Cylinders 12x18
 9. Vulture 2-2-0 built 1839 Driving wheels 5'6" diameter, Cylinders 12x18 
 10. Eagle 2-2-0 built 1839 Driving wheels 5'6" diameter, Cylinders 12x18

Edward Bury and Company
Edward Bury and Company, Liverpool
 7. Lion 2-2-0 built 1839 Driving wheels 5'6" diameter, Cylinders 12x18 
 8. Tiger 2-2-0 built 1839 Driving wheels 5'6" diameter, Cylinders 12x18
 11. Leopard 2-2-0 built 1840 Driving wheels 5'6" diameter, Cylinders 12x18
 12. Panther 2-2-0 built 1840 Driving wheels 5'6" diameter, Cylinders 12x18 
 13. Reindeer ' 2-2-0 built 1840 Driving wheels 5'6" diameter, Cylinders 12x18 
 14. Antelope 2-2-0 built 1840 Driving wheels 5'6" diameter, Cylinders 12x18
 15. Unicorn 2-2-0 built 1840 Driving wheels 5'6" diameter, Cylinders 12x18 
Leopard hauled the inaugural train from Nottingham to Leicester

 16. Cerberus 2-2-0 built 1840 Driving wheels 5'6" diameter, Cylinders 13x18 
 17. Caliban 2-2-0 built 1840 Driving wheels 5'6" diameter, Cylinders 13x18
 18. Basilisk 2-2-0 built 1840 Driving wheels 5'6" diameter, Cylinders 13x18 
 19. Phantom 2-2-0 built 1840 Driving wheels 5'6" diameter, Cylinders 13x18
 35. Vizier 2-2-0 built 1841 Driving wheels 5'6" diameter, Cylinders 13x18
 36. Vandal 2-2-0 built 1841 Driving wheels 5'6" diameter, Cylinders 13x18 
 37. Siren 2-2-0 built 1841 Driving wheels 5'6" diameter, Cylinders 13x18 
 38. Sultan 2-2-0 built 1841 Driving wheels 5'6" diameter, Cylinders 13x18

Four Coupled
 42. Buffalo 0-4-0 built 1840 Driving wheels 5'0" diameter, Cylinders 13x18
 43. Bloodhound 0-4-0 built 1840 Driving wheels 5'0" diameter, Cylinders 13x18
 44. Mastiff 0-4-0 built 1840 Driving wheels 5'0" diameter, Cylinders 13x18
 45. Mammoth 0-4-0 built 1841 Driving wheels 5'0" diameter, Cylinders 13x18

Nasmyth, Gaskell and Company
Nasmyth, Gaskell and Company, Patricroft
 20. Lightning 2-2-0 built 1840 Driving wheels 5'6" diameter, Cylinders 12x18 
 21. Lucifer 2-2-0 built 1840 Driving wheels 5'6" diameter, Cylinders 12x18 
 22. Hurricane 2-2-0 built 1840 Driving wheels 5'6" diameter, Cylinders 12x18
 23. Firebrand 2-2-0 built 1840 Driving wheels 5'6" diameter, Cylinders 12x18 
 24. Rainbow 2-2-0 built 1840 Driving wheels 5'6" diameter, Cylinders 12x18 
 25. Sirocco 2-2-0 built 1840 Driving wheels 5'6" diameter, Cylinders 12x18
 39. Wolf 2-2-2 built 1840 Driving wheels 5'0" diameter, Cylinders 14x18
(presumably bought as a freight engine)

William Fairbairn & Sons
William Fairbairn & Sons, Liverpool
 40. Harlequin 0-4-0 built 1840 Driving wheels 5'0" diameter, Cylinders 12x18
(renamed Shark in 1842/3)
 41. Ganymede 0-4-0 built 1840 Driving wheels 5'0" diameter, Cylinders 12x18

Benjamin Hick and Sons
Benjamin Hick and Sons, Bolton
 26. Dragon 2-2-0 built 1840 Driving wheels 5'6" diameter, Cylinders 12x18 
 27. Scorpion  2-2-0 built 1840 Driving wheels 5'6" diameter, Cylinders 12x18
 28. Hornet 2-2-0 built 1840 Driving wheels 5'6" diameter, Cylinders 12x18 
 29. Wivern 2-2-0 built 1840 Driving wheels 5'6" diameter, Cylinders 12x18 
 30. Vampire 2-2-0 built 1840 Driving wheels 5'6" diameter, Cylinders 12x18
 31. Lynx 2-2-0 built 1840 Driving wheels 5'6" diameter, Cylinders 12x18 
 32. Centaur 2-2-0 built 1841 Driving wheels 5'6" diameter, Cylinders 13x18 
 33. Hydra 2-2-0 built 1841 Driving wheels 5'6" diameter, Cylinders 13x18
 34. Harpy 2-2-0 built 1841 Driving wheels 5'6" diameter, Cylinders 13x18

Contractors locomotives
Vivid, which opened the line from Leicester to Rugby, was a contractor's locomotive.

References

 The Nottingham and Derby Railway Companion, (1839) Republished 1979 with Foreword by J.B.Radford, Derbyshire Record Society

2-2-0 locomotives
2-2-2 locomotives
0-4-2 locomotives
Midland Railway locomotives